CFRO-FM, licensed and owned by Vancouver Co-operative Radio, is a non-commercial community radio station in Vancouver, British Columbia. It is a legally registered co-operative and is branded as Co-op Radio. The station broadcasts on 100.5 MHz FM and have studios and offices on Columbia Street off Hastings Street. in Vancouver's Downtown East Side, while its transmitter is located atop Mount Seymour. CFRO is a member of the National Campus and Community Radio Association.

History 
CFRO-FM received its radio license from the CRTC on May 7, 1974.

The station first went on the air April 14, 1975, launched by people mostly from various local activist groups in Vancouver. The station airs programmes in four categories: public affairs and news, music, multi-lingual, and arts. The group producing each programme is mostly self-governing—within the co-operative frame.

On December 9, 2010, CFRO applied to exchange frequencies with CKPK-FM, which operated at 100.5 MHz. This application was approved by the Canadian Radio-television and Telecommunications Commission on September 9, 2011. The frequency swap occurred on September 10, 2012.

Programming 
Public affairs programmes and subjects in English include Redeye (radio) (news and analysis on Saturday mornings), Wake Up With Co-op (three weekday mornings), The Brown Bagger (lectures and interviews four weekdays at noon), several programmes by and about aboriginal people, learning Coast Salish, Union Made (labour news), politics, women, international affairs (special programmes on Latin America, the Philippines, and Palestine), health, LGBTQ+ issues, parenting, youth, the environment, animal rights, neighbourhood news, senior citizens, disabled people, yoga, and Democracy Now (from the USA).

Programmes air in ten foreign languages:  Armenian, Azeri, Amharic, Persian, Korean, Nepali, Polish, Serbo-Croatian, South Slav, and Spanish.

Music programmes specialize in one or more of these: aboriginal, accordion, African, alternative, bluegrass, blues, Caribbean, classical, Celtic, electronic, folk, fusion, gospel, hardcore, hip hop, house, India, jazz, Jewish, Latin, metal, old timey, punk, reggae, rock 'n' roll, roots, rumba, ska, soul, swing, tango, and world music.  The weekly classical music program, "West Coast Classics," is the longest-running classical radio program on the air produced in Canada.

Arts programming includes arts news, poetry, comedy, sound art, show tunes and other music, and story-telling.

Nearly 100 different programme series air each week. Most of the late-night and week-end programmes are music and repeats, with public affairs and specialty talk programmes running mostly Monday through Friday in the day and evening. (See schedule in the external link below.)

Listening and technical aspects 
The station is licensed by the Canadian government's broadcast regulating agency, the Canadian Radio-television and Telecommunications Commission (CRTC), with occasional license challenges by members of the public who object to some view-points and statements being broadcast.

Organisational structure 
Founded in 1975, Co-operative Radio, CFRO, 100.5 FM is an innovative non-profit community radio station & podcast recording studio that provides a voice for those underrepresented in mainstream media. Co-operative Radio offers access to community space, training and equipment for 300+ volunteers who produce 140 hours of original programming in over ten languages. They have more than 300 volunteer programmers that help supply content 24 hours a day in domains such as arts, public affairs, music and third languages.

They pride themselves in their inclusivity in terms of sex, race, age, class, ability, and sexual orientation. The station seeks to produce a media outlet for the economically, socially, or politically disadvantaged and to provide news and perspectives not covered in mainstream media coverage. Their vision evokes a co-operative society rooted in social justice values with respectful dialogue among the diverse community they serve. By promoting progressive social and economic change, and equal opportunities and outcomes, they challenge systems of oppression. Their content is produced through local channels for artists that are yet to establish themselves and/or who deal with contemporary social issues. Rooted in volunteerism and diversity, they help to uplift marginalized groups' voices through alternative radio programming.

They operate under the Community Radio Education Society (CRES) charity, which runs the Media Arts Committee (MAC). This foundation supports the audio community in Vancouver through grants and by lending artists and members the opportunity to borrow professional audio equipment. The Board of Directors and staff members are composed of nine individual volunteers. Their responsibilities include monitoring all station activities, hiring management and deliberating substantial decisions within the community. The spatiality of the radio station has social implications as the building resides in the heart of the downtown eastside of Vancouver.

Awards 
Co-op Radio has received many awards and is sometimes called the leading co-op radio station in Canada.
National Campus and Community Radio Association Broadcasting Excellence awards received by Co-op Radio include:
 2012 Outstanding Achievement, Music Programming: "West Coast Classics," by Kerry Regier
 2007 Best Documentary (tie): Marc the Knife: The Overshadowed Career of Marc Blitzstein (Steve Bowell)
 2006 Best Documentary: 30 Years of Prison Justice Day by Emily Aspinwall and Tiffany Chong
 2003 Programming Excellence;  Redeye (radio) public affairs program
 1997 Programming Excellence  "Voices from the 11th International AIDS Conference"
 1995 Programming Excellence "Earth Day on the Air"

References

External links 
 Co-op Radio
 
 

Fro
Fro
Media cooperatives in Canada
Radio stations established in 1975
1975 establishments in British Columbia